The Women's road race of the 2009 Dutch National Road Race Championships cycling event took place on 27 June 2009. The race started in the province Limburg in Heerlen and finished in Landgraaf, the Netherlands. The competition was run over a 117 km course. 64 women's finished the race.

Final results (top 10)

Source

See also
2009 Dutch National Time Trial Championships – Women's time trial

References

External links
Official website 

Dutch National Road Race Championships (women)
2009 in Dutch sport
2009 in women's road cycling